Southside 1-1000 is a 1950 semidocumentary-style film noir directed by Boris Ingster featuring Don DeFore, Andrea King, George Tobias and Gerald Mohr as the off-screen narrator. It is about a Secret Service agent (Don DeFore) who goes undercover and moves into a hotel run by a beautiful female manager (Andrea King), so that he can investigate a counterfeiting ring. The agent is up against hardened felons such as the gang member played by George Tobias, an unusual example of casting against type for the typically comic actor. It is one of Ingster's two film noirs, the other being Stranger on the Third Floor (1940), which is considered the first noir film.

Plot
Based on a true story, the US Secret Service searches for a gang of counterfeiters, whose brilliant engraver Eugene Deane (Morris Ankrum) has secretly made his plates while in San Quentin prison on a life sentence, and had them smuggled out by a priest tricked into serving as a mule. The film starts as documentary-style section in which a male narrator explains the crucial role of paper currency in underpinning trade in the economy. Then the narrator explains how the US Treasury Department ensures that the value of this currency is safeguarded by using its intrepid Secret Service agents, who find fake bills in circulation and track down and arrest the counterfeiters who created them. This part of the film, which has a patriotic and jingoistic feel, shows newsreel-style stock footage of Treasury Department agents ("T-Men") and US soldiers fighting in the then-active Korean War.

When counterfeit $10 bills spread across the country, showing up at casinos and racetracks, the Treasury Department realizes that the bills are Deane's work. The officers set up surveillance on the counterfeit gang and find a travelling salesman who has been distributing the bills across the country, hoping to capture and interrogate him. However, a ruthless member of the counterfeiting gang (George Tobias) gets to the salesman first and kills him by throwing him out a window before he can talk and possibly lead the agents to the gang.

The Secret Service then puts undercover agent John Riggs (Don DeFore) on the case. Riggs poses as a thief who is interested in buying and selling counterfeit bills, to learn more about the gang and gather evidence. Riggs works the clues, which leads him to a Los Angeles hotel where the dead salesman lived. Riggs moves into the hotel as part of his undercover work, where he gets recruited by gang members. He also meets the beautiful hotel manager, Nora Craig (Andrea King).

While Riggs is romantically attracted to Craig, he also realizes that she may be connected to the counterfeiting gang. Riggs finds out that Craig is not only the manager of the hotel, but also the boss of the counterfeiting gang, commanding a crew of hardened felons. He finds out that her father is Deane, the old engraver in prison. The movie's climax arrives when the counterfeiters realize Riggs is a federal agent and threaten to kill him. As other federal agents and police invade the gang's lair, it ends up set on fire. The gang and officers have a pitched gun battle amidst cable car rail trestles and bridges, and Craig plunges to her death.

Cast
 Don DeFore as John Riggs/Nick Starnes
 Andrea King as Nora Craig
 George Tobias as Reggie
 Barry Kelley as Bill Evans
 Morris Ankrum as Eugene Deane
 Robert Osterloh as Albert
 Charles Cane as Harris
 Kippee Valez as Singer
 Joe Turkel as Frankie
 John Harmon as Nimble Willie
 G. Pat Collins as Hugh B. Pringle – Treasury Agent
 Douglas Spencer as Prison Chaplain
 Joan Miller as Mrs. Clara Evans
 William Forrest as Prison Warden

Production
The final fight-to-the-death scene was filmed aboard Los Angeles' "Angels Flight", a cable-car service hanging 40 feet above the ground.

It was the last in a series of movies King Brothers made for Allied Artists.

Reception
A November 1950 review in The New York Times commented: "In the cinema's library of routine gangster fiction, Southside 1-1000 merits a comfortable middle-class rating being neither especially exciting nor particularly dull".

Film critic Craig Butler of Allmovie wrote, "Southside 1-1000 is a good pseudo-noir film told in pseudodocumentary fashion, but it also must register as a bit of a disappointment. It's functional and all the parts fit together smoothly, making it run like a fairly well-oiled machine -- but it lacks real spark. Given director Boris Ingster's impressive work on the seminal Stranger on the Third Floor, one expects something a bit more unusual or off the beaten path – or at least distinctive. Instead, Southside looks like it could have been the work of any competent director".  Michael Barrett of PopMatters rated it 4/10 stars and called it "an unnecessary and forgettable entry in the genre".

References

External links
 
 
 
 
 Southside 1-1000 information site and DVD review at DVD Beaver (includes images)
 

1950 films
1950 crime films
American crime films
American black-and-white films
Film noir
Allied Artists films
Counterfeit money in film
Films scored by Paul Sawtell
1950s English-language films
1950s American films